Mid Clyth was a railway station located between Wick and Lybster, Highland.

History 
The station was opened as part of the Wick and Lybster Railway on 1 July 1903. As with the other stations on the line, the station was closed from 3 April 1944.

References

Notes

Sources 
 
 
 

Disused railway stations in Caithness
Railway stations in Great Britain opened in 1903
Railway stations in Great Britain closed in 1944
William Roberts railway stations